Kampot Cement Co. Ltd. is the largest cement producer in Cambodia. It was established in 2005 as a 92.5:7.5 joint venture between Siam Cement and the Khaou Chuly Group, Cambodia's top construction and engineering firm.

Its cement production facility in Kampot Province opened in February 2008 and has a production capacity of 950.000 tons of cement per year.

References

http://www.car.gov.kh/hunsen/cement_factory_kampot_province_en.asp
http://english.people.com.cn/200601/26/eng20060126_238629.html
http://www.khaouchulygroup.com/

External links
 Khaou Chuly Group
 Siam Cement

Cement companies of Cambodia
Kampot province
Cambodian brands